Achachi Qala (Aymara for "gigantic stone", Hispanicized spelling Achachicala) is a  mountain in the Bolivian Andes. It is located in the La Paz Department, Murillo Province, Palca Municipality. Achachi Qala lies southwest of Ch'iyar Qullu.

References 

Mountains of La Paz Department (Bolivia)